Hazlettville is an unincorporated community in Kent County, Delaware, United States. Hazlettville is located at the intersection of Westville Road and Hazlettville Road, southwest of Dover and west of Wyoming.

References

Unincorporated communities in Kent County, Delaware
Unincorporated communities in Delaware